Welsh cakes (or ), also bakestones or pics, are a traditional sweet bread in Wales. They have been popular since the late 19th century with the addition of fat, sugar and dried fruit to a longer standing recipe for flat-bread baked on a griddle.

The cakes are also known as griddle cakes or bakestones within Wales because they are traditionally cooked on a bakestone ( or ), a cast-iron griddle about ½" (1.5 cm) or more thick which is placed on the fire or cooker; on rare occasions, people may refer to them as griddle scones. 

Welsh cakes are made from flour, butter or lard, currants, eggs, milk, and spices such as cinnamon and nutmeg. They are roughly circular, a few inches (7–8 cm) in diameter and about half an inch (1–1.5 cm) thick.

Welsh cakes are served hot or cold, sometimes dusted with caster sugar. Unlike scones, they are not usually eaten with an accompaniment, though they are sometimes sold ready split and spread with jam, and they are sometimes buttered.

See also
 Heavy cake from Cornwall
 Singing hinny from northern England

References

External links

 The BBC's description
 Welsh Cakes (Picau ar y maen) Recipe
 Welsh tourist board Welsh cake recipe

Welsh cuisine
Sweet breads
British cakes